Matthias Zimmer (born 3 May 1961) is a German author and politician of the Christian Democratic Union (CDU) who has been serving as a member of the Bundestag from the state of Hesse from 2009, winning a constituency in Frankfurt am Main for three terms until 2021.

Political career 
Zimmer became a member of the Bundestag in the 2009 German federal election. In parliament, he was a member of the Committee on Labour and Social Affairs and the Committee on Human Rights and Humanitarian Aid, the latter of which he chaired from 2017 until 2018.

In addition to his committee assignments, Zimmer co-chaired the German-Canadian Parliamentary Friendship Group.

In an internal vote on the CDU candidate for the 2021 elections, Zimmer lost against Axel Kaufmann.

Political positions 
In June 2017, Zimmer voted against his parliamentary group’s majority and in favor of Germany’s introduction of same-sex marriage.

In 2019, Zimmer joined 14 members of his parliamentary group who, in an open letter, called for the party to rally around Angela Merkel and party chairwoman Annegret Kramp-Karrenbauer amid criticism voiced by conservatives Friedrich Merz and Roland Koch.

Selected publications 

 Nationales Interesse und Staatsräson. Zur Deutschlandpolitik der Regierung Kohl 1982–1989. Paderborn 1992
 with Udo Margedant: Eigentum und Freiheit. Eigentumstheorien im 17. und 18. Jahrhundert. Idstein 1993
 Ed.: Germany – Phoenix in Trouble? Edmonton 1997
 Ed. with Angelika Sauer: A Chorus of Different Voices. German-Canadian Identities. New York 1998
 Moderne, Staat und Internationale Politik. Wiesbaden 2008
 with Thomas Scheben: Der Hund am Fallschirm. Streifzüge durch die Frankfurter Geschichte. Frankfurt am Main 2009
 Ed. with Michael Thielen: Die Zukunft der Arbeit. Christlich-Soziale Perspektiven. Berlin 2013
 Nachhaltigkeit! Für eine Politik aus christlicher Grundüberzeugung. Freiburg 2015
 Am Rande der Politik. Frankfurt am Main 2016
 Person und Ordnung. Einführung in die Soziale Marktwirtschaft. Freiburg 2020.
 Alte Werte in neuer Zeit. Christliche Verantwortung und praktische Politik. Frankfurt am Main 2021
 Morandus. Frankfurt am Main 2021
 Abenteuer Bundestag. Norderstedt 2022
 Der tote Bundestagsabgeordnete. Frankfurt am Main 2022

References

External links 

  
 Bundestag biography 

1961 births
Living people
Members of the Bundestag for Hesse
Members of the Bundestag 2017–2021
Members of the Bundestag 2013–2017
Members of the Bundestag 2009–2013
Members of the Bundestag for the Christian Democratic Union of Germany